Canacomyrica is a monotypic genus of flowering plants in the family Myricaceae containing the single species Canacomyrica monticola. It is endemic to New Caledonia. This endangered tree or small shrub is limited to ultramafic serpentine soils.

Conservation
This species is known from eleven sites in the southern province of New Caledonia. It is threatened by mining, bushfires, and logging.

References

Kubitzki, K. (1993). In Kubitzki, K. (Series Editor): The Families and Genera of Vascular Plants, Vol.2: K. Kubitzki, Rohwer, J. G., & Bittrich, V. (volume editors), p. 456. Springer-Verlag Berlin .

External links

Site Association Endémia from New Caledonia with photos of Canacomyrica monticola

Myricaceae
Monotypic Fagales genera
Endemic flora of New Caledonia
Near threatened plants
Trees of the Pacific